This is a list of Members of Parliament (MPs) elected to the House of Representatives at the 1999 Nepalese legislative election and subsequent by-elections.

The list is arranged by constituency. Tara Nath Ranabhat served as the Speaker. There were three prime ministers before the parliament was dissolved in 2002. Krishna Prasad Bhattarai, Girija Prasad Koirala and Sher Bahadur Deuba served as prime ministers during the term of this parliament.

House of Representatives composition

Leaders

Officeholders 

 Speaker of the House of Representatives: Rt. Hon. Taranath Ranabhat (Nepali Congress)
 Deputy Speaker of the House of Representatives: Hon. Chitra Lekha Yadav (Nepali Congress)
 Prime Minister of Nepal (Nepali Congress):
 Hon. Krishna Prasad Bhattarai (until 17 March 2000)
 Hon. Girija Prasad Koirala (from 20 March 2000 to 19 July 2001)
 Hon. Sher Bahadur Deuba (from 22 July 2001)
 Leader of the Opposition (CPN (UML)): Hon. Madhav Kumar Nepal

Whips 

 Government Chief Whip (Nepali Congress):
 Hon. Gopal Man Shrestha (until 21 April 2000)
 Hon. Binaya Dhoj Chand (from 21 April 2000 to 23 July 2001)
 Hon. Tek Bahadur Basnet (from 23 July 2001)
 Government Whip (Nepali Congress):
 Hon. Tek Bahadur Basnet (until 21 April 2000)
 Hon. Tek Bahadur Chokhyal (from 21 April 2000 to 22 July 2001)
 Hon. Ramesh Lekhak (From 23 August 2001)
 Opposition Chief Whip (CPN (UML)): Hon. Bharat Mohan Adhikari
 Opposition Whip (CPN (UML): Hon. Parshuram Meghi Gurung

List of MPs elected in the election

By-elections

References

External links 
Election Commission of Nepal
संसदीय विवरण पुस्तिका, प्रतिनिधि सभा (२०५६ - २०५९) (Parliament Report Booklet, House of Representatives (1999 - 2002)) (in Nepali)

General election 1999}
1999-related lists
General election